Callambulyx tatarinovii, or  in Japanese, is a moth of the family Sphingidae. The species was first described by Otto Vasilievich Bremer and William (Wasilii) Grey in 1853.

Distribution 
It is found from northern Xinjiang across northern China, Mongolia, southern Siberia to the Russian Far East and Japan, and then south through Korea and central China to eastern Tibet. It is also found in Taiwan.

Description 

It is very similar to Smerinthus kindermannii, but the forewing colours are predominantly green and grey although there is a northern form in which all green coloration is replaced by brown.

Biology 
There are one to two generations per year in China. In Korea, adults are on wing from early May to mid-October.
The larvae have been recorded feeding on Ulmus parvifolius in Guangdong and Zelkova in northern China. Other recorded food plants in China include Euonymus alatus, Salix, Populus and Prunus persica, but these require confirmation. In Korea, recorded host plants include Ulmus davidiana var. japonica, Zelkova serrata, Tilia amurensis and Euonymus sieboldianus, while Ulmus japonica is recorded for the Russian Far East. Subspecies C. t. gabyae has been recorded feeding on Zelkova serrata.

Subspecies
Callambulyx tatarinovii tatarinovii (from northern Xinjiang across northern China, Mongolia, southern Siberia to the Russian Far East and Japan, and then south through Korea and central China to eastern Tibet)
Callambulyx tatarinovii formosana - Clark, 1935 (Taiwan)
Callambulyx tatarinovii gabyae - Bryk, 1946 (Japan)

References

Callambulyx
Moths of Asia
Moths described in 1853
Moths of Japan